Mixmaster is a Type II anonymous remailer which sends messages in fixed-size packets and reorders them, preventing anyone watching the messages go in and out of remailers from tracing them.  It is an implementation of a Chaumian Mix network.

History 
Mixmaster was originally written by Lance Cottrell, and was maintained by Len Sassaman. Peter Palfrader is the current maintainer. Current Mixmaster software can be compiled to handle Cypherpunk messages as well; they are needed as reply blocks for nym servers.

See also 

 Anonymity
 Anonymous P2P
 Anonymous remailer
 Cypherpunk anonymous remailer (Type I)
 Mixminion (Type III)
 Onion routing
 Tor (network)
 Pseudonymous remailer (a.k.a. nym servers)
 Penet remailer
 Data privacy
 Traffic analysis

References

Further reading
 Email Security, Bruce Schneier
 Computer Privacy Handbook, Andre Bacard

External links
 Mixmaster homepage
 Official Mixmaster Remailer FAQ
 Remailer FAQ
 Remailer Vulnerabilities
 A/I: PARANOIA REMAILER HOWTO
 Feraga.com: Howto use a Type II Anonymous Remailer (link not active 12 May 2010)

Anonymity networks
Internet Protocol based network software
Routing
Network architecture
Mix networks